The Javanese Wikipedia is the edition of Wikipedia in the Javanese language. Started on 8 March 2004, the Javanese Wikipedia reached 10,000 articles on 3 May 2007. The Indonesian media has discussed the Javanese Wikipedia. Although the Wikipedia logo was written in the Javanese script since the beginning of the edition, the articles themselves could only be written in the Roman script until 2013.

Milestones

Gallery

See also
 Papat Limpad, writing competition.
 Papat Limpad 2012, writing competition.

References

External links 

  Javanese Wikipedia
  Javanese Wikipedia mobile version

Internet properties established in 2004
Javanese language
Wikipedias by language
Indonesian encyclopedias